Eye 2 Eye: Live In Madrid is a live concert performance by Alan Parsons released on both DVD-Video and Audio CD on April 6, 2010 on the Frontiers label.  The show was performed with his band Alan Parsons Live Project, and was recorded live at the Plaza Mayor, Madrid, Spain, on May 14, 2004.  
 
Per Alan Parsons' official website: "this DVD was previously available as Alan Parsons Live In Madrid with different cover artwork" (2005, Appertaining, Inc.).

Track listing
All songs written by Eric Woolfson and Alan Parsons, except where noted.

DVD and CD track listing, TRT 80 minutes:
 "I Robot" – 5:34
 "Can't Take It With You" – 4:48
 "Don't Answer Me" – 4:39
 "Breakdown / The Raven" – 5:44
 "Time" – 5:24
 "Psychobabble" – 7:32
 "I Wouldn't Want to Be Like You" – 3:56
 "Damned If I Do" – 5:31
 "More Lost Without You" (Parsons, P. J. Olsson) – 3:25
 "Don't Let It Show" – 4:25
 "Prime Time" – 5:58
 "Sirius / Eye in the Sky" – 7:12
 "(The System Of) Dr. Tarr and Professor Fether" – 4:13
 "Games People Play" – 5:18

Personnel
Alan Parsons -  acoustic guitar, keyboards and vocals
P. J. Olsson -  acoustic guitar and vocals
Godfrey Townsend -  lead guitar and vocals
Steve Murphy -  drums and vocals
Manny Focarazzo -  keyboards and vocals
John Montagna -  bass guitar and vocals

References

2010 live albums
2010 video albums
Alan Parsons albums
Frontiers Records live albums
Frontiers Records video albums